Promenade on the Peninsula is the current name of originally enclosed, now open-air regional shopping mall in Rolling Hills Estates on the affluent Palos Verdes Peninsula in the South Bay area of Greater Los Angeles.
Former names include The Courtyard, Shops at Palos Verdes and Avenue of the Peninsula.

History
In November 1978, developers Ernest Hahn and Ron Florance revealed plans for a $40 million enclosed mall on a 14-acre site just east of the already existing Peninsula Center, a smaller center with Buffums as the only department store anchor. "The Courtyard" as it was to be named, would launch with a Bullocks Wilshire and the May Company California as its department store anchors, plus 75 additional shops. It also debuted with a community theater and an indoor Ice Capades Chalet ice skating rink. The city council approved the plan in June 1979 and an agreement with the neighboring city of Rancho Palos Verdes was reached in March 1980.

The mall opened in Fall 1981 during the Early 1980s recession. By March 1982, 65 of the 92 stores were occupied. The ice skating rink was well patronized, but it proved difficult to attract shoppers from the immediate area who had already become accustomed to driving to what is now Del Amo Fashion Center which had a far wider selection of department and specialty stores. A fire in the center in April 1984 caused $1 million in damage. The mall was renovated in September 1988. The Hahn Company began an $11 million project to upgrade the mall and its tenants to become more attractive to the most upscale shoppers, and renamed it The Shops at Palos Verdes. The mall was doing relatively well and harming business at the next-door Peninsula Center

1990s
In January 1997,  the mall lost both department store anchors, the Robinsons-May (which had replaced May Company) and what had been the Bullocks Wilshire, as Macy's acquired the chain and closed stores. In February 1998, Cousins Properties of Atlanta bought the mall from the Hahn Co. for $13.5 million, and began another renovation, this time costing $78 million. The mall would be renamed The Avenue of the Peninsula. The mall closed for renovation from January to November 1999. The roof was removed and a more upscale selection of specialty shops was achieved, with new department store anchor Saks Fifth Avenue as well as Pottery Barn, Restoration Hardware and Abercrombie & Fitch opening in 1999 and 2000. Regal Cinemas expanded and remodeled in 1999, using the third floor of the empty former Robinsons-May building to add additional theaters, resulting in today's Regal Promenade Stadium 13.

2000s
The Avenue saw an improvement in foot traffic and business in 2002. A Borders Books and Music store opened in August of that year. Saks Fifth Avenue, the only department store anchor, closed on May 13, 2006. In November 2006, Cousins sold the mall to Stoltz Real Estate Partners of Pennsylvania for $95.7 million. Stolz polled the community for a new name for the mall in February 2008, with the winning name being The Promenade on the Peninsula, which it was renamed in March 2008. Borders went bankrupt and closed its Palos Verdes store February 2011.

References

Shopping malls in the South Bay, Los Angeles
Palos Verdes Peninsula